Dobbs Weir Lock (No 6) is a lock on the River Lee Navigation near Hoddesdon.

Location 
The lock is south of the nearby Dobbs Weir, and stands close to the confluence of the Lynch Brook and the Old River Lea. To the east of the lock is the Nazeing Mead complex of lakes which incorporates part of the River Lee Flood Relief Channel.

Public access
Vehicular access via Meadgate Road from Carthagena Lock.

Walking and cycle access along the towpath that forms part of the Lea Valley Walk.

Public transport
Broxbourne railway station

External links 
 Dobbs Weir lock photographs
 Nazeing Meads
 Dobbs Weir Lock - a history

Locks of the Lee Navigation
Locks in Essex
Locks in Hertfordshire